Evgeni Krasnopolski (born 4 October 1988) is a Ukrainian-born Israeli retired pair skater. Krasnopolski and Andrea Davidovich were the first pair representing Israel to qualify for Israel at the 2014 Olympics. They finished 15th in Sochi. Krasnopolski competed with Danielle Montalbano from 2009 to 2012. He competed for Israel at the 2018 Winter Olympics with Paige Conners in figure skating in pairs skating and a team event in Pyeongchang, South Korea.  He and Hailey Kops competed at the 2021 CS Nebelhorn Trophy and qualified to compete for Israel at the 2022 Winter Olympics.

Personal life 
Krasnopolski was born in Kyiv, Ukrainian SSR, Soviet Union, and is Jewish. He arrived in Israel with his family when he was three years old.

Career

Early years 
Krasnopolski began skating as an eight-year-old at the Canada Centre in Metula. As a single skater, he won three silver medals on the senior national level at the Israeli Championships (2004–2005, 2009). He competed mainly on the junior level internationally. At age 20, he moved to New Jersey in the United States for training.

With Montalbano 
In 2009, Krasnopolski teamed up with Danielle Montalbano to compete in pair skating. The two began competing together in the 2009–10 season. They withdrew from the 2011 European Figure Skating Championships after Montalbano dislocated her shoulder during practice.

In May 2011, Krasnopolski was charged with deserting from the Israeli army. The Israeli skating federation stated, "We've asked for clarifications [about his service], and if we would have gotten them immediately, Evgeni would have returned. The decision to let him stay abroad for training was a professional call made by the federation. The soldier got the (right) impression that we are handling the matter with the IDF and that he could trust the federation".

Montalbano/Krasnopolski medalled at several senior B events in the 2011–12 season and finished 11th at the 2012 European Figure Skating Championships and 17th at the World Championships. They competed at several events in the fall of 2012, including a Grand Prix event, the 2012 Skate America, but missed the rest of the season due to injury; Montalbano broke her ankle in November 2012 while practicing a twist lift. Montalbano/Krasnopolski were coached by Kyoko Ina. Their partnership ended in 2013.

With Davidovich 
In the spring of 2013, Krasnopolski teamed up with Andrea Davidovich, a former singles skater. They were coached by Gennadi Krasnitski and Galit Chait at the Ice House in Hackensack, New Jersey.

Davidovich/Krasnopolski made their international debut at the 2013 U.S. International Classic, where they finished sixth. Their next event was the 2013 Nebelhorn Trophy, the final opportunity to qualify for the 2014 Olympics. By placing tenth, Davidovich/Krasnopolski earned Israel its first ever pairs' entry at an Olympics. In December, they won the 2013 Golden Spin of Zagreb. They placed seventh at the 2014 European Championships.

At the 2014 Winter Olympics in Sochi, Davidovich/Krasnopolski finished 15th overall. Their partnership ended following the Olympics. Krasnopolski said they were unable to agree on a coach.

With Tankova 
Krasnopolski formed a partnership with Adel Tankova. They were coached by Galit Chait Moracci and Anton Nimenko in Hackensack, New Jersey.

Tankova/Krasnopolski made their international debut in September 2015, placing sixth at the 2015 U.S. Classic, a part of the 2015–16 ISU Challenger Series (CS). They finished 7th at the 2015 CS Mordovian Ornament, fourth at the 2016 Toruń Cup, and 13th at the 2016 European Championships.

With Cherniavskaia 
In 2016, Krasnopolski teamed up with Arina Cherniavskaia.

With Conners 
In 2017, Krasnopolski teamed up with Paige Conners.

He competed for Israel at the 2018 Winter Olympics with Conners in Figure Skating in pairs skating (coming in 19th) and a team event in Pyeongchang, South Korea.

With Vernikov 
In 2019, Krasnopolski teamed up with Anna Vernikov, who is 14 years younger.

With Kops 
In July 2021, Krasnopolski announced that he had teamed up with Hailey Kops. After three months' preparation, they competed at the 2021 CS Nebelhorn Trophy to attempt to qualify a berth for Israel at the 2022 Winter Olympics. Seventh in the short program, they were fourth in the free skate and rose to fifth overall, sufficient to qualify for the third of three available pairs spots. They qualified for the free skate in the pairs event, finishing fifteenth overall.

Programs

With Kops

With Vernikov

With Conners

With Cherniavskaia

With Tankova

With Davidovich

With Montalbano

Single skating

Competitive highlights 
GP: Grand Prix; CS: Challenger Series; JGP: Junior Grand Prix

Pairs with Kops

Pairs with Vernikov

Pairs with Conners

Pairs with Cherniavskaia

Pairs with Tankova

Pairs with Davidovich

Pairs with Montalbano

Single skating

See also
Sports in Israel

References

External links 

 
 
 
 
 
 
 
 
 
 

1988 births
Living people
Sportspeople from Kyiv
Jewish Ukrainian sportspeople
Ukrainian emigrants to Israel
Citizens of Israel through Law of Return
Israeli male single skaters
Israeli male pair skaters
Jewish Israeli sportspeople
People from Metula
Figure skaters at the 2014 Winter Olympics
Figure skaters at the 2018 Winter Olympics
Figure skaters at the 2022 Winter Olympics
Olympic figure skaters of Israel
Israeli people of Ukrainian-Jewish descent